"Silent Voices" is a song recorded by American singer Dionne Warwick in 1968.

The Italian single versions had "Una piccola candela" (Tony Del Monaco) and "Unchained Melody" (Dionne Warwick) both as B-sides, while the English album version was a song from the album Dionne Warwick in Valley of the Dolls (23 March 1968); American author Norman Monath wrote the English lyrics, which bear no relation to the original Italian.

Cover versions
The Supremes
Tom Jones
Toni Lamond

References

1968 songs
Dionne Warwick songs
Tom Jones (singer) songs
The Supremes songs